Lost in Wrestling, also known as 3D Lost in Wrestling, is a 2015 Chinese-Hong Kong 3D sports drama film directed by Casey Chan. It was released in China on June 5, 2015.

Cast
William Chan as Ruonan 
Karina Zhao as Naren
Li Feier as Moon-moon
Naoko Watanabe
Siqin Gaowa
Cheng Pei-pei
Li Yixin
Lau Siu Ming
Lau Dan

Reception
By June 5, 2015 the film had earned  at the Chinese box office.

On The Hollywood Reporter, Elizabeth Kerr called the film "a swift, sentimental sports drama that flirts with camp but is saved by its own good nature."

References

2010s sports drama films
2015 3D films
2010s Cantonese-language films
Chinese 3D films
Chinese sports drama films
Hong Kong 3D films
Hong Kong sports drama films
2010s Japanese-language films
2010s Mandarin-language films
Wrestling films
2015 drama films
2015 films
2015 multilingual films
Chinese multilingual films
Hong Kong multilingual films
2010s Hong Kong films